Maviz Rural District is in the Central District of Shahriar County, Tehran province, Iran. At the National Census of 2006, its population was 6,199 in 1,499 households. There were 6,291 inhabitants in 1,632 households at the following census of 2011. At the most recent census of 2016, the population of the rural district was 5,782 in 1,597 households. The largest of its three villages was Baba Salman, with 4,859 people.

References 

Shahriar County

Rural Districts of Tehran Province

Populated places in Tehran Province

Populated places in Shahriar County